Hudgens is a surname. Notable people with the surname include:

Christopher Hudgens (born 1977), American artist
Dave Hudgens (born 1956), American baseball player and coach
Dave Hudgens (American football) (born 1955), American football player
John E. Hudgens (born 1967), American film maker
Ralph Hudgens (born 1942), American politician
Vanessa Hudgens (born 1988), American actress and singer